Mazu (also Romanized as Māzū) is a village in Mazu Rural District, Alvar-e Garmsiri District, Andimeshk County, Khuzestan Province, Iran. At the 2006 census, its population was 498, in 111 families.

References 

Populated places in Andimeshk County